is a former Japanese football player. He played for Japan national team.

Club career
Tsuchihashi was born in Yokohama on July 23, 1972. After graduating from Kokushikan University, he joined Urawa Reds in 1995. He played as defensive midfielder from first season. However his opportunity to play decreased form the late 1990s. He retired end of 2003 season.

National team career
On May 26, 1996, Tsuchihashi debuted for Japan national team against Yugoslavia.

Club statistics

National team statistics

References

External links
 
 Japan National Football Team Database
 

1972 births
Living people
Kokushikan University alumni
Association football people from Kanagawa Prefecture
Japanese footballers
Japan international footballers
J1 League players
J2 League players
Urawa Red Diamonds players
Association football midfielders